George Barlow (19 June 1847, in London –  1913 or 1914) was an English poet, who sometimes wrote under the pseudonym James Hinton.

Barlow was the son of George Barnes Barlow, Master of the Crown Office, and was educated at Harrow School and Exeter College, Oxford. He moved to London in 1871, and continued to live there after his marriage a year later. A prolific poet, his collected Poetical Works amounted to over 3,000 pages of verse. Barlow was dubbed the 'Bard of the sixteen sonnets a day' by his acquaintance Charles Marston, and 'the Poet of spiritualism' by Edward Bennett; his sonnet sequences explored spiritualism and erotic love.

In addition to his published poetry oeuvre, Barlow wrote at least two non-fiction books,  History of the Dreyfus case (1898) and The genius of Dickens.  He was a regular contributor to the Contemporary Review.

Works
A life's love, [1873]. New edition, 1882
(as James Hinton), An English madonna, 1874
Under the dawn, 1875
The gospel of humanity: or the connection between spiritualism and modern thought, 1876
The marriage before death, and other poems, 1878
The two marriages, a drama in three acts, 1878
Through death to life, 1878
To Gertrude in the Spirit World, 1878
Love-songs, 1880
Time's whisperings: sonnets and songs, 1880
Song-bloom, 1881
Song-spray, 1882
An actor's reminiscences, and other poems, 1883
(as James Hinton), Love's offering, 1883
Poems real and ideal, 1884
Loved beyond words, 1885
The pageant of life: an epic poem in five books, 1888. New edition, 1910
From dawn to sunset, 1890
A lost mother, 1892
The crucifixion of man: a narrative poem, 1893. Second edition, 1895
Jesus of Nazareth, a tragedy, [1896]
Woman regained. A novel of artistic life, 1896
The daughters of Minerva. A novel of artistic life, [1898]
A history of the Dreyfus case : from the arrest of Captain Dreyfus in October, 1894, up to the flight of Esterhazy in September, 1898, 1899
To the women of England, and other poems, 1901
The Poetical Works of George Barlow, London: Henry Glaisher, 11 vols, 1902–14
A coronation poem, 1902
Vox clamantis: sonnets and poems, 1904
The higher love. A plea for a noble conception of human love, 1905. Reprinted from the Contemporary Review.
The triumph of woman, prose essays, 1907
A man's vengeance, and other poems, 1908
The genius of Dickens, 1909. Reprinted from the Contemporary Review.
Songs of England awaking, 1909. Second edition, 1910
Selected poems, 1921. With note by C. W., bibliography and short life.

References

External links

1847 births
1910s deaths
People educated at Harrow School
Alumni of Exeter College, Oxford
Sonneteers
English male poets